Alexey Vatutin (born 27 October 1992) is a Russian tennis player.

Vatutin achieved a career high ATP singles ranking of 136 on 2 July 2018. He has won one ATP Challenger singles title and ten ITF singles titles.

One of his best results in the ATP World Tour so far was reaching the quarterfinal of Marrakech in 2018.

Performance timeline

Singles

ATP Challenger and ITF Futures/World Tennis Tour finals

Singles: 20 (11-9)

Doubles: 1 (0–1)

External links
 
 

1992 births
Living people
Russian male tennis players
Sportspeople from Volgograd